Bayan Qulï (died 1358) was khan of the Chagatai Khanate from 1348 to 1358 and a grandson of Duwa.

In 1348 Bayan Qulï was raised to the position of khan by the ruler of the Qara'unas, Amir Qazaghan, who had effectively taken control of the Chagatai ulus in 1346. For the next decade he remained Qazaghan’s puppet, exercising little real authority. In 1358 Qazaghan was assassinated and succeeded by his son ‘Abdullah. Not long after his ascension, ‘Abdullah had Bayan Qulï killed and selected a new puppet, Shah Temur, to succeed him. Bayan Qulï’s death was used as a pretext by ‘Abdullah’s enemies to bring about his downfall that same year.

The Mongols, prior to the conquest of Ma wara'u'n-nahr and Semirechye were primarily shamanistic. However, in the 14th century many of those in Central Asia converted to Islam. Bayan-Quli Khan was a Moslem and a faithful stalwart of a Khorasani sheikh, Saif ed-Din Boharsi. Therefore, he was buried opposite the sheikh's grave. The mausoleum rises above the Bayan-Quli Khan grave since 1358.

The dinars, coined in Shahrisabz in 1357 (758), became a good evidence of Bayan Quli's piousness, because of saying, engraved on them: "Bayan-Quli-bahadur Khan is the greatest sultan. May Allah prolong his reign".

References

Manz, Beatrice Forbes, The Rise and Rule of Tamerlane. Cambridge University Press, 1989, .

See also 

Saif ed-Din Bokharzi & Bayan-Quli Khan Mausoleums

1358 deaths
Chagatai khans
14th-century Mongol rulers
Year of birth unknown